This is a list of universities and other higher education institutions in Melanesia.

Regional
 University of the South Pacific, Emalus (Port Vila, Vanuatu) and Laucala (Suva, Fiji)

Fiji

Fiji College of Advanced Education
Fiji College of Agriculture
 Fiji Institute of Technology 
 Fiji National University
 Fiji School of Medicine, Suva
Fiji School of Nursing
Fulton College
Lautoka Teachers College
Pacific Flying School
South Pacific Bible College
 University of Fiji, Saweni
 University of the South Pacific, Suva

New Caledonia
 University of New Caledonia, Nouméa

Papua New Guinea

 Divine Word University, Madang
 Pacific Adventist University, Boroko
 University of Technology, Lae
 University of Goroka, Goroka
 University of Papua New Guinea, Port Moresby
 IBS University, Port Moresby
 University of Natural Resources and Environment, Vudal
 Christian Leadership Training College, Banz
 Port Moresby Business College, Port Moresby

Solomon Islands

 Solomon Islands National University, Honiara
 University of the South Pacific, Honiara

Vanuatu

 University of the South Pacific, Port Vila

Rankings of universities 

2008 Ranking Web of World Universities

Currently the Webometrics Ranking is the only that covers Melanesian universities. Most of them are provided in the Oceania section but Indonesian ones are provided under the Asia entry.

2006 Shanghai Jiao Tong University's academic ranking of world universities

As yet, no Melanesian universities appear in the Academic Ranking of World Universities produced by Shanghai Jiao Tong University's Institute of Higher Education.

2006 Times Higher Education Supplement Melanesian Rankings

Two universities were ranked in the Times Higher Education Supplement, both from Indonesia:
 Airlangga University
 Bandung Institute of Technology

Asiaweeks Melanesian top ranking universities

In 2000, Asiaweek ranked Asia's universities and grouped them according to whether they were a generalist multi-disciplinary or a science and technology university.

In 1999, Asiaweek released the first regional listing of Asia's best universities. Melanesian universities in the list and their rankings were:

References 

Ranking Web of World Universities

See also 
 List of colleges and universities
 List of colleges and universities by country

Universities
Universities
Melanesia